Marina Yuryevna Mokhnatkina (née Kormiltseva, born 12 May 1988) is a sambo competitor and mixed martial artist. Mokhnatkina is a six-time world champion and two-time European champion in sambo. She is also an eight-time Russian champion in sambo. She has signed with MMA promotion Professional Fighters League (PFL) to fight in the women's featherweight division.

She is married to sambist and mixed martial artist Mikhail Mokhnatkin.

Mixed martial arts career

Bellator MMA
Marina made her Bellator debut against Janay Harding on March 29, 2019 at Bellator 219. She lost the bout via unanimous decision.

Marina was scheduled to face Jessica Borga on December 10, 2020 at Bellator 254. The bout was cancelled due to unknown reasons.

Marina faced Amanda Bell on June 11, 2021 at Bellator 260. She won the bout via unanimous decision.

Professional Fighters League 
On July 15, 2021, Marina announced that her contract with Bellator had expired and she signed with the PFL.

Marina was scheduled to face Kaitlin Young on August 19, 2021 at PFL 8. After Young was scratched from the bout, Marina was scheduled against Claudia Zamora. She won the fight by unanimous decision.

PFL season 2022 
Marina faced Kayla Harrison on May 6, 2022 at PFL 3. She lost the bout via unanimous decision.

Marina faced Abigail Montes on July 1, 2022 at PFL 6. She won the close bout via split decision.

Marina faced Tatiane Aguiar on December 3, 2022 at RCC 13, winning the bout via keylock submission in the third round.

2023 Season 
Marina is set to start off the 2023 season agains tYoko Higashi on April 7, 2023 at PFL 2.

Mixed martial arts record

|-
|Win
|align=center|8–3
|Tatiane Aguiar
|Submission (keylock)
|RCC 13
|
|align=center|3
|align=center|4:00
|Yekaterinburg, Russia
|
|-
|Win
|align=center| 7–3
|Abigail Montes
|Decision (split)
|PFL 6
|
|align=center|3
|align=center|5:00
|Atlanta, Georgia, United States
|
|-
|Loss
|align=center| 6–3
|Kayla Harrison
|Decision (unanimous)
|PFL 3
|
|align=center|3
|align=center|5:00
|Arlington, Texas, United States
|
|-
| Win
| align=center| 6–2
|Claudia Zamora
|Decision (unanimous)
|PFL 8 
|
|align=center|3
|align=center|5:00
|Hollywood, Florida, United States
|
|-
| Win
| align=center| 5–2
|Amanda Bell
|Decision (unanimous)
|Bellator 260
|
|align=center|3
|align=center|5:00
|Uncasville, Connecticut, United States
|
|-
| Loss
| align=center| 4–2
| Janay Harding
| Decision (unanimous)
| Bellator 219
| 
| align=center| 3
| align=center| 5:00
| Temecula, California, United States
| 
|-
| Loss
| align=center| 4–1
| Liana Jojua
| Decision (majority)
| Fight Nights Global 83: Alibekov vs. Aliev
| 
| align=center| 5
| align=center| 5:00
| Moscow, Russia
| For the inaugural  FNG Women's Bantamweight Championship 
|-
| Win
| align=center| 4–0
| Karine Silva
| Submission (kneebar)
| Fight Nights Global 81: Matmuratov vs. Ignatiev
| 
| align=center| 1
| align=center| 0:58
| Omsk, Russia
| 
|-
| Win
| align=center| 3–0
| Irina Degtyareva
| Submission (armbar)
| Fight Nights Global 69: Bagautinov vs. Nobre
| 
| align=center| 1
| align=center| 1:26
| Novosibirsk, Russia
| 
|-
| Win
| align=center| 2–0
| Karina Vasilenko
| Submission (achilles lock)
| Fight Nights Global 53: Day 2 - Mineev vs. Enomoto 
| 
| align=center| 1
| align=center| 2:52
| Moscow, Russia
| 
|-
| Win
| align=center| 1–0
| Ekaterina Torbeeva
| Submission (armbar)
| Fight Nights Global 50: Fedor vs. Maldonado
| 
| align=center| 1
| align=center| 0:25
| Saint Petersburg, Russia
|

References

External links
 Marina Mokhnatkina at Bellator (archived)
 

1988 births
Russian female mixed martial artists
Bantamweight mixed martial artists
Russian sambo practitioners
Sportspeople from Perm, Russia
Living people
Bellator female fighters
Featherweight mixed martial artists
Lightweight mixed martial artists
Sambo practitioners at the 2019 European Games
European Games medalists in sambo
European Games bronze medalists for Russia
Universiade gold medalists for Russia
Mixed martial artists utilizing sambo